Australia is a highly developed country with a mixed economy. As of 2022, Australia was the 14th-largest national economy by nominal GDP (gross domestic product), the 20th-largest by PPP-adjusted GDP, and was the 22nd-largest goods exporter and 24th-largest goods importer. Australia took the record for the longest run of uninterrupted GDP growth in the developed world with the March 2017 financial quarter. It was the 103rd quarter and the 26th year since the country had a technical recession (two consecutive quarters of negative growth). As of June 2021, the country's GDP was estimated at 1.98 trillion.

The Australian economy is dominated by its service sector, which in 2017 comprised 62.7% of the GDP and employed 78.8% of the labour force.   At the height of the mining boom in 2009–10, the total value-added of the mining industry was 8.4% of GDP. Despite the recent decline in the mining sector, the Australian economy had remained resilient and stable and did not experience a recession from 1991 until 2020.

The Australian Securities Exchange in Sydney is the 16th-largest stock exchange in the world in terms of domestic market capitalisation and has one of the largest interest rate derivatives markets in the Asia-Pacific region. Some of Australia's largest companies include Commonwealth Bank, BHP, CSL, Westpac, NAB, ANZ, Fortescue Metals Group, Wesfarmers, Macquarie Group, Woolworths Group, Rio Tinto, Telstra, Woodside Energy, and Transurban. The currency of Australia and its territories is the Australian dollar, which it shares with several Pacific nation states.

Australia's economy is strongly intertwined with the countries of East and Southeast Asia, also known as ASEAN Plus Three (APT), accounting for about 64% of exports in 2016. China in particular is Australia's main export and import partner by a wide margin. Australia is a member of the APEC, G20, OECD and WTO. The country has also entered into free trade agreements with ASEAN, Canada, Chile, China, South Korea, Malaysia, New Zealand, Peru, Japan, Singapore, Thailand and the United States. The ANZCERTA agreement with New Zealand has greatly increased integration with the economy of New Zealand and in 2011 there was a plan to form an Australasian Single Economic Market by 2015.

History

20th century

Australia's average GDP growth rate for the period 1901–2000 was 3.4% annually. As opposed to many neighbouring Southeast Asian countries, the process towards independence was relatively peaceful and thus did not have significant negative impact on the economy and standard of living. Growth peaked during the 1920s, followed by the 1950s and the 1980s. By contrast, the late 1910s/early 1920s, the 1930s, the 1970s and early 1990s were marked by financial crises.

Economic liberalisation

From the early 1980s onwards, the Australian economy has undergone intermittent economic liberalisation. In 1983, under prime minister Bob Hawke, but mainly driven by treasurer Paul Keating, the Australian dollar was floated and financial deregulation was undertaken.

Early 1990s recession

The early 1990s recession came swiftly after the Black Monday of October 1987, as a result of a stock collapse of unprecedented size which caused the Dow Jones Industrial Average to fall by 22.6%. This collapse, larger than the stock market crash of 1929, was handled effectively by the global economy and the stock market began to quickly recover. But in North America, the lumbering savings and loans industry was facing decline, which eventually led to a savings and loan crisis which compromised the well-being of millions of US people. The following recession thus impacted the many countries closely linked to the US, including Australia. Paul Keating, who was treasurer at the time, famously referred to it as "the recession that Australia had to have." During the recession, GDP fell by 1.7%, employment by 3.4% and the unemployment rate rose to 10.8%. However, the recession did assist in reducing long-term inflation rate expectations and Australia has maintained a low inflation environment since the 1990s to the present day.

Mining

Mining has contributed to Australia's high level of economic growth, from the gold rush in the 1840s to the present day. The opportunities for large profits in pastoralism and mining attracted considerable amounts of British capital, while expansion was supported by enormous government outlays for transport, communication, and urban infrastructures, which also depended heavily on British finance. As the economy expanded, large-scale immigration satisfied the growing demand for workers, especially after the end of convict transportation to the eastern mainland in 1840. Australia's mining operations secured continued economic growth and Western Australia itself benefited strongly from mining iron ore and gold from the 1960s and 1970s which fueled the rise of suburbanisation and consumerism in Perth, the capital and most populous city of Western Australia, as well as other regional centres.

Global financial crisis

The Australian government stimulus package ($11.8 billion) helped to prevent a recession.

The World Bank expected Australia's GDP growth rate to be 3.2% in 2011 and 3.8% in 2012. The economy expanded by 0.4% in the fourth quarter of 2011, and expanded by 1.3% in the first quarter of 2012. The growth rate was reported to be 4.3% year-on-year.

The International Monetary Fund in April 2012 predicted that Australia would be the best-performing major advanced economy in the world over the next two years; the Australian Government Department of the Treasury anticipated "forecast growth of 3.0% in 2012 and 3.5% in 2013", the National Australia Bank in April 2012 cut its growth forecast for Australia to 2.9% from 3.2%., and JP Morgan in May 2012 cut its growth forecast to 2.7% in calendar 2012 from a previous forecast of 3.0%, also its forecast for growth in 2013 to 3.0% from 3.3%. Deutsche Bank in August 2012, and Société Générale in October 2012, warned that there is risk of recession in Australia in 2013.

While Australia's overall national economy grew, some non-mining states and Australia's non-mining economy experienced a recession.

2020 recession

In September 2020, it was confirmed that due to the effects of the COVID-19 pandemic, the Australian economy had gone into recession for the first time in nearly thirty years, as the country's GDP fell 7 per cent in the June 2020 quarter, following a 0.3 per cent drop in the March quarter. It officially ended at the beginning of December 2020.

Data 
The following table shows the main economic indicators in 1980–2021 (with IMF staff estimates in 2022–2027). Inflation under 5% is in green.

Overview

Australia's per-capita GDP is higher than that of the UK, Canada, Germany and France in terms of purchasing power parity. Per Capita GDP (PPP) Australia is ranked 18th in the world (CIA World Factbook 2016). The country was ranked fifth in the United Nations 2022 Human Development Index and sixth in The Economist worldwide quality-of-life index 2005. In 2014, using constant exchange rates, Australia's wealth had grown by 4.4% annually on average after the financial crisis of 2007–2008, compared with a 9.2% rate over 2000–2007. Australia's sovereign credit rating is "AAA" for all three major rating agencies, higher than the United States of America.

The emphasis on exporting commodities rather than manufactures underpinned a significant increase in Australia's terms of trade during the rise in commodity prices since 2000. However, due to a colonial heritage a lot of companies operating in Australia are foreign-owned and as a result, Australia has had persistent current account deficits for over 60 years despite periods of positive net merchandise exports; given the net income outlay between Australia and the rest of the world is always negative. The current account deficit totalled AUD$44.5 billion in 2016 or 2.6% of GDP.

Inflation has typically been between 2 and 3% and the pre-GFC cash rate typically ranged between 5 and 7%, however, partly in response to the end of the mining boom the cash rate has recently been steadily falling, dropping from 4.75% in October 2011 to 1.5% in Aug 2016, then to 1.25% in June 2019 and 1.0% in July 2019. The service sector of the economy, including tourism, education and financial services, constitutes 69% of GDP. Australian National University in Canberra also provides a probabilistic interest-rate-setting project for the Australian economy, which is compiled by shadow board members from the ANU academic staff.

Rich in natural resources, Australia is a major exporter of agricultural products, particularly wheat and wool, minerals such as iron ore and gold, and energy in the forms of liquified natural gas and coal. Although agriculture and natural resources constitute only 3% and 5% of GDP, respectively, they contribute substantially to Australia's export composition. Australia's largest export markets are Japan, China, South Korea, India and the US.

At the turn of the current century, Australia experienced a significant mining boom. The mining sector's contribution to overall GDP grew from around 4.5% in 1993–94, to almost 8% in 2006–07. The services sector also grew considerably, with property and business services in particular growing from 10% to 14.5% of GDP over the same period, making it the largest single component of GDP (in sectoral terms). This growth has largely been at the expense of the manufacturing sector, which in 2006–07 accounted for around 12% of GDP. A decade earlier, it was the largest sector in the economy, accounting for just over 15% of GDP.

In 2018 Australia became the country with the largest median wealth per adult, but slipped back to second highest after Switzerland in 2019. Australia's total wealth was estimated to be AUD$10.9 trillion as of September 2019.

Regional differences
Between 2010 and 2013, much of the economic growth in Australia was attributed to areas of the country where mining- and resource-based industries and services are mostly located. Western Australia and the Northern Territory are the only states that have economic growth. During 2012 and 2013 Australian Capital Territory, Queensland, Tasmania, South Australia, New South Wales and Victoria experienced recessions at various times. The Australian economy is characterised as a "two-speed economy". From June 2012 to March 2013 Victoria experienced a recession. In 2012 the Government of Victoria cut 10% of all jobs in the public service. The period since has seen these trends reversed with Western Australia and Northern Territory, who are heavily dependent on mining, experience significant downturns in GDP while the eastern states returned to growth, led by strong upturns in NSW and Victoria.

Taxation

 
Taxation in Australia is levied at the federal, state, and local government levels. The federal government raises revenue from personal income taxes and business taxes. Other taxes include the goods and services tax (General Service Tax), excise and customs duties. The federal government is the main source of income for state governments. As a result of state dependence on federal taxation revenue to meet decentralised expenditure responsibilities, Australia is said to have a vertical fiscal imbalance.

Besides receipts of funds from the federal government, states and territories have their own taxes, in many cases as slightly different rates. State taxes commonly include payroll tax levied on businesses, a poker-machine tax on businesses that offer gambling services, land tax on people and businesses that own land and most significantly, stamp duty on sales of land (in every state) and other items (chattels in some states, unlisted shares in others, and even sales of contracts in some states).

The states effectively lost the ability to raise income tax during the Second World War. In 1942, Canberra invoked its Constitutional taxation power (s. 51 (ii)) and enacted the Income Tax Act and three other statutes to levy a uniform income tax across the country. These acts sought to raise the funds necessary to meet burgeoning wartime expenses and reduce the unequal tax burden between the states by replacing state income taxes with a centralised tax system. The legislation could not expressly prohibit state income taxes (s. 51(ii) does not curtail the power of states to levy taxes) but the federal government's proposal made localised income tax extremely difficult politically. The federal government offered instead compensatory grants authorised by s. 96 of the Constitution for the loss of state income (State Grants (Income Tax Reimbursement) Act 1942).

The states rejected Canberra's regime and challenged the legislation's validity in the First Uniform Tax Case (South Australia v Commonwealth) of 1942. The High Court of Australia held that each of the statutes establishing Commonwealth income tax was a valid use of the s. 51(ii) power, in which Latham CJ noted that the system did not undermine essential state functions and imposed only economic and political pressure upon them.

The Second Uniform Tax Case (Victoria v Commonwealth (1957)) reaffirmed the court's earlier decision and confirmed the power of the federal government's power to make s. 96 grants conditionally (in this case, a grant made on the condition that the recipient state does not levy income tax).

Since the Second Uniform Tax Case, a number of other political and legal decisions have centralised fiscal power with the Commonwealth. In Ha vs. New South Wales (1997), the High Court found that the Business Franchise Licences (Tobacco) Act 1987 (NSW) was invalid because it levied a customs duty, a power exercisable only by the Commonwealth (s.90). This decision effectively invalidated state taxes on cigarettes, alcohol and petrol. Similarly, the imposition of a Commonwealth goods and services tax (GST) in 2000 transferred another revenue base to the Commonwealth.

Consequently, Australia has one of the most pronounced vertical fiscal imbalances in the world: the states and territories collect just 18% of all governmental revenues but are responsible for almost 50% of the spending areas. Furthermore, the centralisation of revenue collection has allowed Canberra to force state policy in areas well beyond the scope of its constitutional powers, by using the grants power (s.96) to mandate the terms on which the states spend money in areas over which it has no power (such as spending on education, health and policing).

Local governments (called councils in Australia) have their own taxes (called rates) to enable them to provide services such as local road repairs, local planning and building management, garbage collection, street cleaning, park maintenance services, libraries, and museums. Councils also rely on state and federal funding to provide infrastructure and services such as roads, bridges, sporting facilities and buildings, aged care, maternal and child health, and childcare.

In 2000, a goods and services tax (GST) was introduced, similar to the European-style VAT.

Employment

According to the Australian Bureau of Statistics (ABS) seasonally adjusted estimates, the unemployment rate remained steady at 3.5% in February 2023 while the labor force participation rate decreased slightly to 66.6%. The participation rate for 15- to 24-year-olds decreased by 0.3 point to 71.8% while the unemployment rate for this group increased by 0.3 points to 7.9%. According to the ABS, in February 2023, the underemployment rate increased to 5.9%, while the underutilisation rate (the unemployed plus the under-employed) remained at 9.5%.

According to Roy Morgan Research the unemployment rate in April 2019 was 8.9%, while Australian workers who were considered either unemployed or underemployed was estimated to be 17.7% (2.381 million) in the same month. Around 4.219 million were estimated to be in part-time employment.

In 2007, 228,621 Newstart unemployment allowance recipients were registered, a total that increased to 646,414 or 5.3% of the total labour force by March 2013. As of December 2018, the number of Newstart recipients stands at 722,923 or 5.4% of the labour force.

The accuracy of official unemployment figures has been brought into question in the Australian media due to discrepancies between the methods of different research bodies (Roy Morgan versus the ABS), differing definitions of the term 'unemployed' and the ABS' practice of counting under-employed people as "employed".

As of August 2022, the Australia labour force were employed in the following industries:

Employment for newly qualified professionals
According to the Australian Graduate Survey done by Graduate Careers Australia, full-time employment for newly qualified professionals from various occupations (around four months after the completion of their qualifications) experienced some declines between 2012 and 2015. Some examples are:

The Graduate Careers Survey 2014 explained, "However, GCA's Beyond Graduation Survey (BGS) indicates that the middle- and longer-term outlook is very positive, with the employment figures for 2010 graduates growing by 14 percentage points three years later." The Beyond Graduation Survey 2013 included 12,384 responses and the Graduate Careers Survey 2014 survey included 113,263 responses ("59.3 per cent of the almost 191,000 Australian resident graduates who were surveyed responded to the AGS.")

The professional associations of some of these occupations expressed their criticism of the immigration policy in 2014.

States and territories ranked by unemployment rates

Note: All data in the table above is seasonally adjusted.

Sectors

Industry

Mining

In 2019, the country was the 2nd largest world producer of gold; 8th largest world producer of silver; 6th largest world producer of copper; the world's largest producer of iron ore; the world's largest producer of bauxite; the 2nd largest world producer of manganese; 2nd largest world producer of lead; 3rd largest world producer of zinc; 3rd largest world producer of cobalt; 3rd largest producer of uranium; 6th largest producer of nickel; 8th largest world producer of tin; 14th largest world producer of phosphate; 15th largest world producer of sulfur; in addition to being the 5th largest world producer of salt. The country is also a major producer of precious stones. Australia is the world's largest producer of opal and is one of the largest producers of diamond, ruby, sapphire and jade. In non-renewable energies, in 2020, the country was the 30th largest producer of oil in the world, extracting 351.1 thousand barrels / day. In 2019, the country consumed 1 million barrels / day (20th largest consumer in the world). The country was the 20th largest oil importer in the world in 2018 (461.9 thousand barrels / day). In 2015, Australia was the 12th largest world producer of natural gas, 67.2 billion m3 per year. In 2019, the country was the 22nd largest gas consumer (41.9 billion m3 per year) and was the 10th largest gas exporter in the world in 2015: 34.0 billion m3 per year. In the production of coal, the country was the 4th largest in the world in 2018: 481.3 million tons. Australia is the 2nd largest coal exporter in the world (387 million tons in 2018) 

In 2014–15 mineral extraction in Australia was valued at 212 billion Australian dollars. Of this, coal represented 45,869 million, oil and natural gas 40,369 million, iron ore 69,486 million, gold ore 13,685 million, and other metals 7,903 million.

Coal is mined primarily in Queensland, New South Wales and Victoria. Fifty-four per cent of the coal mined in Australia is exported, mostly to East Asia. In 2000–01, 258.5 million tonnes of coal was mined, and 193.6 million tonnes exported. Coal provides about 85% of Australia's electricity production. In fiscal year 2008–09, 487 million tonnes of coal was mined, and 261 million tonnes exported. Australia is the world's leading coal exporter.

The Australian mining corporations Rio Tinto Group and BHP are among the largest in the world.

Rio Tinto's Argyle mine in Western Australia was the second-largest diamond mine in the world. The Argyle mine opened in 1983 and has produced more than 95 per cent of Australia's diamonds, including some of the world's most valuable pink and red diamonds. Due to the depletion of ore, Argyle closed in 2020—the closure was expected to reduce Australia's yearly diamond output from 14.2 million carats to 134.7 thousand carats.

Manufacturing

The manufacturing industry in Australia has declined from 30% of GDP in the 1960s to 12% of GDP in 2007.

In 2008, four companies mass-produced cars in Australia. Mitsubishi ceased production in March 2008, followed by Ford in 2016, and Holden and Toyota in 2017.

Until trade liberalisation in the mid 1980s, Australia had a large textile industry. This decline continued through the first decade of the 21st century. Since the 1980s, tariffs have steadily been reduced; in early 2010, the tariffs were reduced from 17.5 per cent to 10 per cent on clothing, and 7.5–10% to 5% for footwear and other textiles.
As of 2010, most textile manufacturing, even by Australian companies, is performed in Asia.

Agriculture

In 2019, the value added from agriculture, fishing and forestry combined made up approximately 2.1% of Australia's GDP. 60% of farm products are exported. Irrigation is an important and widespread practice for a country where many parts receive low rainfall. Agriculture, forestry and fishing was the second-strongest  industry from 2013 to 2015, with the number of employees growing from 295,495 in February 2013 to 325,321 in February 2015.

Services
IT-related jobs (such as computer systems design and engineering) are defined as Professional, Scientific and Technical Services by the Department of Education, Employment and Workplace Relations of Australia. IT job creation occurs mostly in the state capital cities of Australia.

Finance
Australia's "big four banks" (National Australia Bank, Commonwealth Bank, Australia and New Zealand Banking Group and Westpac) are among the 'World's 50 Safest Banks' as of April 2012.

Between 1991 and 2013, 36,720 mergers and acquisitions with a total known value of US$2,040 billion with the involvement of Australian firms have been announced. In the year 2013, 1,515 transactions valued at US$78 billion had been announced which was a decrease in terms of numbers (−18%) and value (−11%) compared to 2012. The largest takeover or merger transaction involving Australian companies was the 2007 takeover of the Coles Group by Wesfarmers, totalling A$22 billion.

Tourism

In the financial year 2017/18, tourism represented 3.1% of Australia's GDP contributing A$57.2 billion to the national economy. Domestic tourism is a significant part of the tourism industry, representing 73% of the total direct tourism GDP.

In calendar year 2018, there were 9.3 million visitor arrivals. Tourism employed 646,000 people in Australia in 2017–18, 5.2% of the workforce. About 43.7% of persons employed in tourism were part-time. Tourism also contributed 8.0% of Australia's total export earnings in 2010–11.

Creativity and culture 
Growing importance is being given to the economic contribution of the creative industries to the national economy. The United Nations Conference on Trade and Development (UNCTAD) recompiles statistics about the export and import of goods and services related to the creative industries. The World Intellectual Property Organization (WIPO) has assisted in the preparation of national studies measuring the size of over 50 copyright industries around the world. According to the WIPO compiled data, the national contribution of Creative industries varies from 2% to 11% depending on the country.

The Australian Copyright Council (ACC) has been consistently compiling reports using the WIPO-guided framework on the impact of the copyright-based industries to Australia's economy in 2011, 2012, and 2014. In the most up-to-date WIPO-supported study published in 2017, the copyright industries contributed $122.8 billion to the Australian economy in 2016 amounting to  7.4% of Australia's total economic output. The 2016 figure represented an increase of $8.5 billion compared to 2011, with a growth in value added growing at 1.4% per annum (since 2011). Further, it found that these industries generated more economic output than the manufacturing, health care and mining sectors in 2016, and moved from being the 7th largest industry in 2011 to the 3rd in 2016.

Media

In 2018, Australia was ranked 19th out of 180 countries in accordance to press freedom. The media industry is highly consolidated, with News Corp Australia and Nine Entertainment publishing the majority of popular newspapers, owning multiple television and radio stations, and providing the two major Australian streaming services, Binge and Stan. Other major media companies include Ten Network, Seven West Media and the national broadcasters ABC and SBS.

Education

School attendance is compulsory in Australia, from the age of 5 up until approximately 16 (although it varies between each state and territory). Australia also has an adult literacy rate that was estimated to be 99% in 2003.

In the Programme for International Student Assessment, Australia regularly scores among the top five of thirty major developed countries (member countries of the Organisation for Economic Co-operation and Development). In 2018 there were 525,054 international students in Australia, comprising a market of 32,2 billion A$.

Logistics

Infrastructure

Transportation

There are many forms of transport in Australia. Australia is highly dependent on road transport. There are more than 300 airports with paved runways. Passenger rail transport includes widespread commuter networks in the major capital cities with more limited intercity and interstate networks. The Australian mining sector is reliant upon rail to transport its product to Australia's ports for export.

Energy

The Australian economy is dependent on imported crude oil and petroleum products, the economy's petroleum import dependency is around 80%—crude oil + petroleum products.

Trade and economic performance

In the second half of the 20th century, Australian trade shifted away from Europe and North America to Japan and other East Asian markets. Regional franchising businesses, now a $128 billion sector, have been operating co-branded sites overseas for years with new investors coming from Western Australia and Queensland.

In the late 19th century, Australia's economic strength relative to the rest of the world was reflected in its GDP. In 1870, Australia had the highest GDP per capita in the world due to economic growth fuelled by its natural resources. However, as Australia's population grew rapidly over the 20th century, its GDP per capita dropped relative to countries such as the US and Norway. However, the Australian economy has been performing nominally better than other economies of the OECD and has supported economic growth for over 20 consecutive years. According to the Reserve Bank of Australia, Australian per capita GDP growth is higher than that of New Zealand, US, Canada and The Netherlands. The past performance of the Australian economy has been heavily influenced by US, Japanese and Chinese economic growth.

Australian national debt

Australia's net external debt exceeded $1 trillion in April 2017 as a result of Australia's structural current account deficits. Although these deficits have narrowed over the last decade due to an increase in net merchandise trade, this effect has been partly offset by the return of Australian government debt; net federal debt was estimated at $326.0 billion in the 2016–17 federal budget of which 60% is owed to foreigners. The entirety of the debt has been accumulated through ten straight budget deficits as Australia had negative net government debt (i.e. The Australian government had net positive bond holdings) a decade earlier in the 2006–07 fiscal year.

Chinese investment
There is substantial export to China of iron ore, wool and other raw materials, and over 120,000 Chinese students study in Australian schools and universities. China is the largest purchaser of Australian debt. In 2009, offers were made by state-owned Chinese companies to invest $22 billion in Australia's resource extraction industry.

The Signing of the China-Australia Free-Trade Agreement, signed November 2014, has the potential to drastically increase Chinese Investments as agriculture and services become more lenient.

Australia's special investor visa program introduced in 2012 encouraged Chinese investment. The visa program fast-tracks visas and eases the residency requirement for a permanent visa for those ready to invest over five million Australian dollars into state government bonds, specific infrastructure and property investments. Wealthy Chinese interested in direct investment began looking to Australia after Canada started scaling back its investment visa program in 2012 and eliminated its main investor visa program in 2014. In early 2014 it was reported that the Australia's special investor visa was granted to 65 mostly Chinese millionaires who brought over $440 million into the country. By 2017, almost 90% of the more than 1,300 foreigners who used Australia's special investor visa program were from China. Australia also has an investor visa program with a required investment of one million Australian dollars but with more restrictions and a lengthier period of time to get a permanent visa.

In 2017, it was reported that Australia is the third-most popular destination for Chinese to invest wealth offshore, with a 7% increase in Chinese private wealth flowing into Australia while interest in the top two investment destinations, Hong Kong and the United States, fell by 18% and 3%, respectively. In 2017 there were 1.6 million high-net-worth Chinese (with at least 10 million Chinese yuan to invest) and 24 per cent of the 3,000 wealthy Chinese surveyed had private investments in Australia. Migration was one of the top three reasons for Chinese investment offshore.

In 2018, in the Lowy Institute poll there had a sharp rise in the proportion of the Australian population who say the Australian government is "allowing too much investment from China".

This number rose from 56 per cent in 2014 to 72 per cent in 2018.

Trade agreements

Australia's balance of payments

In trade terms, the Australian economy has had persistently large current account deficits (CADs) for more than 50 years. One of the factors that undermines balance of payments is Australia's export base, making it highly vulnerable to the volatility in the prices of commodity goods. In addition, due to a colonial heritage a lot of companies operating in Australia are foreign-owned and, as a result, Australia's net income outlay between it and the rest of the world is always negative; this results in persistent current account deficits even when there is a positive export.

Dependent upon commodities, the Australian government endeavoured to redevelop the Australian manufacturing sector. This initiative, also known as microeconomic reform, helped Australian manufacturing to grow from 10.1% in 1983–1984 to 17.8% in 2003–2004.

There are other factors that have contributed to the extremely high current account deficit in Australia such as lack of international competitiveness.

However, as Australia's CAD is almost entirely generated by the private sector, as outlined in Professor John Pitchford's 'Consenting Adults Thesis' in the early 1990s, there is an argument that the CAD is not a significant issue. Historically, Australia has relied on overseas capital to fill the gap between domestic savings and investment, and many of these investment opportunities could not have been pursued if Australia did not have access to foreign savings. This suggests that Australia's apparently low savings level and CAD are not necessarily a significant problem. As long as the investment that is being funded by overseas capital inflow generates sufficient returns to pay for the servicing costs in the future, the increase in foreign liabilities can be viewed as sustainable in the longer term.

Personal wealth

According to the 2011 Credit Suisse Global Wealth report, Australia's wealth per adult had quadrupled over the past decade, and its total wealth was US$6.4 trillion. In the report Australia was the second-wealthiest country in the world behind Switzerland based on average wealth per adult, and had the highest median wealth in the world (US$222,000, nearly four times the amount of each US adult) and a proportion of people with wealth above US$100,000 that was eight times the world average. This was attributed to a resilient Australian dollar, property ownership levels and a strong labour market. Compared to the rest of the world, very few Australians had a net worth of less than US$1,000, which was attributed to relatively low credit card and student loan debt. In 2013, Australia was identified by the Credit Suisse as retaining its 2012 position as the nation with the second-highest average wealth per adult (US$403,000); however, the nation's poverty rate was also reported to have increased from 10.2% in 2000–01 to 11.8% at the time of the 2013 report on global wealth.

Despite the economic slowdown, in the 2014 Credit Suisse Global Wealth Report, Australia continued to have the second-highest average wealth per adult (US$430,800) and the highest median wealth (US$225,400), with a total wealth of $7.2 trillion. The average level of real assets (US$319,700) was the second-highest in the world after Norway and 60% of gross household assets. The report explained that this partly reflects a large endowment of land and natural resources relative to population, and also high urban real estate prices. Only 6% of Australians had a net worth below US$10,000, compared to 29% in the US and 70% for the world as a whole. The average debt was 20% of gross assets. The proportion of people with wealth above US$100,000 was the highest in the world (eight times the world average). Australia had 3.8% (1,783,000 people) of the top 1% of global wealth holders while having 0.4% of the world's adult population. The wealth share by Australia's top decile was 51.1% in 2000, 50.7% in 2007, and 51.1% in 2014. In 2016, Australia continued to be the second-wealthiest nation in terms of wealth per adult.

In 2017, Australia was the world's top destination for millionaires, beating the United States for the second consecutive year. An estimated 11,000 millionaires moved to Australia in 2016, compared with the 10,000 who moved to the United States. Australia was especially attractive to Chinese millionaires due to its relative proximity, cleaner environment, political and economic stability, and investor visa programs. Also, the primary reason for millionaires leaving China is top schools abroad that will give their children a better education and career connections.

Mergers and acquisitions 
All in all over 43,150 deals have been completed national, inbound or outbound Australia. This cumulates to an overall value of US$2,554 billion. There was a strong upward trend between 1989 and 2007. In this peak year almost 3,100 deals took place, which is almost 60% more than in 2017, the current low. Australian companies are particularly investing in the fields of metals and minerals (15% of all deals from Australia into foreign countries). Runner-up is the oil and gas industry with only 6.4%.

Here is a list of the top 10 deals with participation of Australian companies as the acquirer or target company:

Poverty
In 2022 ACOSS released a report revealing that poverty is growing in Australia, with an estimated 3.3 million people, or 13.5% of the population, living below the internationally accepted poverty line of 50% of a country's median income. It also estimated that there are 761,000 (17.7%) children under the age of 15 that are in poverty.

Homelessness
There were 105,237 people experiencing homelessness in Australia on census night in 2011. This equated to 1 in 200 Australians, and represented an increase of 17% from the 2006 census, with the rate of homelessness increasing from 45 per 10,000 to 49 per 10,000.

The number of homeless people in Australia jumped by more than 14,000—or 14 per cent—in the five years to 2016, according to census data. The Australian Bureau of Statistics (ABS) said 116,000 people were homeless on census night in 2016, representing 50 homeless people per 10,000.

See also

 Australia and the World Bank
 Home ownership in Australia
 Poverty in Australia
 List of Australian states and territories by gross state product
 Median household income in Australia and New Zealand
 Ranked list of states and territories of Australia

Notes

References

Macfarlane, I. J. (1998). "Australian Monetary Policy in the Last Quarter of the Twentieth Century". Reserve Bank of Australia Bulletin, October 1998
Parham, Dean. (2002). "Microeconomic reforms and the revival in Australia’s growth in productivity and living standards". Assistant Commissioner – Productivity Commission, Canberra Conference of Economists Adelaide, 1 October 2002 (Adobe Acrobat *.PDF document)

Further reading
 Millmow, Alex. A History of Australasian Economic Thought (Routledge, 2017), 250 pp. online review

External links
 Australian Bureau of Statistics
 Department of Finance 
 Australia – OECD

 

 
Australia
Australia